The 2016 British Rowing Junior Championships were the 45th edition of the National Junior Championships, held from 15–17 July 2016 at the National Water Sports Centre in Holme Pierrepont, Nottingham. They were organised and sanctioned by British Rowing, and are open to British junior rowers.

Medal summary

References

British Rowing Junior Championships
British Rowing Junior Championships
British Rowing Junior Championships